Yeni Imaret Bridge is a historic Ottoman bridge in Edirne, Turkey. It crosses the Tunca.

The bridge has six arches, and was constructed between 1484-88 by the architect Hayruddin while he was constructing the Bayezid II Complex for the Ottoman sultan Bayezid II (r. 1481–1512).

References

 Ottoman Architecture, John Freely, page 87, 2011

Ottoman bridges in Turkey
Arch bridges in Turkey
Bridges completed in 1488
Bridges in Edirne
Bridges over the Tunca
Road bridges in Turkey